Trần Đức Lương (born 5 May 1937) is a Vietnamese politician serving as the sixth President of Vietnam from 1997 to 2006.

Early life 
Trần Đức Lương was born in Đức Phổ District in Quảng Ngãi Province, and relocated to Hanoi after graduating from high school in 1954. He studied geology at Hanoi University of Mining and Geology, and was employed as a cartographer.

Career 
He joined the Communist Party of Vietnam in 1959, and became a functionary of the party in the 1970s. In 1987, he became Deputy Prime Minister of Vietnam. Member of the Politburo since June 1996, Trần Đức Lương was elected state president of the Socialist Republic of Vietnam on September 24, 1997, and re-elected in 2002. On June 24, 2006, Lương announced his resignation (along with Prime Minister Phan Văn Khải). Nguyễn Minh Triết was named to succeed Lương as president.

His retirement was quiet and only joined the government national programs or state funerals of others senior members of the Communist Party.

Family 

His son, Trần Tuấn Anh served as Consul General of Vietnam for four years in San Francisco. Then, Trần Tuấn Anh was Vice Chairman of Cần Thơ People's Committee, in charge of investment planning, and social culture. Currently, Trần Tuấn Anh is a Member of the 12th Central Committee, and Minister of Industry and Trade of Vietnam.

In his family, there is another member who works as a social activist is Tran Van Anh- The second granddaughter of Mr. Tran Duc Luong. She graduated from Brown University, a private school in US with full scholarship in Economics and politics. Tran Van Anh and other members of the family has low-profile lifestyle and very limited public information of them compared to his son Trần Tuấn Anh. The only information available about the president's heir generation is that his second granddaughter now works for NGO sector under ministry of Culture, Sports and Tourism of Vietnam. It's been stated that his family members will not become involved in politics.

Other family members of Trần Đức Lương work in commerce, trading field.

References

External links
President rejects appeal of Nam Cam

1937 births
Living people
People from Quảng Ngãi province
Presidents of Vietnam
Members of the Standing Committee of the 8th Politburo of the Communist Party of Vietnam
Members of the 8th Politburo of the Communist Party of Vietnam
Members of the 9th Politburo of the Communist Party of Vietnam
Alternates of the 5th Central Committee of the Communist Party of Vietnam
Members of the 5th Central Committee of the Communist Party of Vietnam
Members of the 6th Central Committee of the Communist Party of Vietnam
Members of the 7th Central Committee of the Communist Party of Vietnam
Members of the 8th Central Committee of the Communist Party of Vietnam
Members of the 9th Central Committee of the Communist Party of Vietnam
Deputy Prime Ministers of Vietnam
Hanoi University of Mining and Geology alumni